Dullabcherra Silchar Fast Passenger is a passenger train belonging to Northeast Frontier Railway zone of Indian Railways that runs between Dullabcherra and Silchar, the largest city in Barak Valley of Assam. It is currently being operated with 55687/55688 train numbers on a tri-weekly basis. It shares its rakes with 55689/Dullabcherra–Badarpur Passenger. It makes its main halt at Karimganj Junction for 25 minutes and locomotive/rake reversals also take place there. The train runs with SGUJ/WDP-4D and SGUJ/WDG-4.

Average speed and frequency 

Route and halts 

The halts of the train are:

 Anipur

Bazarghat
Phakhoagram
Eraligul
 
Nilambazar
 
New Karimganj

Coach composite 

The train has standard ICF rakes with average speed of 22 kmph. The train consists of 7 coaches:

 6 General Unreserved
 1 Seating cum Luggage Rake

Traction

Both trains are hauled by a Guwahati Loco Shed based WDM 3A diesel locomotive from Dullabcherra to Silchar and vice versa.

Rake sharing 

The train shares its rake with 55689/55690 Dullabcherra–Badarpur Passenger.

Direction reversal

Train reverses its direction 1 time:

Notes

References

External links 

 55687/Dullabcherra - Silchar Fast Passenger
 55688/Silchar - Dullabcherra Fast Passenger

Transport in Silchar
Rail transport in Assam
Slow and fast passenger trains in India
Railway services introduced in 2017